Uruno may refer to:

 Uruno Beach on Guam
 Jun Uruno (born 1979), Japanese football player
 Uruno, a character in the Japanese manga Damekko Dōbutsu